Ḫ, ḫ (h-breve below) is a Latin letter used to transliterate:
Arabic  
Aramaic Ḫēt (𐡄) and (ח) 
Akkadian 
Hittite laryngeal h, see Hittite cuneiform
Egyptian x, see Egyptian hieroglyphs
Geʽez letter ኀ (Ḫarm)
Khalaj Latin alphabet
Some Sumerian transliterations in place of Thorn (letter) (þ)

Latin letters with diacritics
Phonetic transcription symbols